Meke Mwase (born 6 July 1972) is a Malawian football coach and former player.

Playing career
Mwase played as a defender for Jomo Cosmos, Michau Warriors and Big Bullets, as well as the Malawi national team.

In April 2019, he was appointed as caretaker manager of the Malawi national football team on a temporary basis. In June 2019 it was announced that the role would be made permanent from 1 July 2019.

References

External links 
 NFT Profile

Jomo Cosmos F.C. players
Nyasa Big Bullets FC players
Malawi international footballers
Malawi national football team managers
Living people
Association football defenders
Malawian footballers
Michau Warriors F.C. players
Malawian expatriate footballers
Malawian expatriates in South Africa
Expatriate soccer players in South Africa
1972 births
Malawian football managers